The Minaean people were the inhabitants of the kingdom of Ma'in (Minaean:  Maʿīn; modern Arabic  Maʿīn) in modern-day Yemen, dating back to the 10th century BCE-150 BCE. It was located along the strip of desert called Ṣayhad by medieval Arab geographers, which is now known as Ramlat Dehem.

The Minaean people were one of four ancient Yemeni groups mentioned by Eratosthenes. The others were the Sabaeans, Ḥaḑramites and Qatabānians. Each of these had regional kingdoms in ancient Yemen, with the Minaeans in the north-west (in Wādī al-Jawf), the Sabaeans to the south-east of them, the Qatabānians to the south-east of the Sabaeans, and the Ḥaḑramites further east still.

History
Nothing is known about the early history of this north Yemeni kingdom. The region later to be known as Ma’īn first enters history at the time of the Sabaean mukarrib Karib’il Watar I, and at that time consisted of a number of small city-states, which were under very strong Sabaean influence. The inscriptions from the city-state of Ḥaram, which date from this time, exhibit Minaean linguistic features, alongside the significant Sabaean impact. The Kingdom of Ma’īn emerged in the 6th century BCE, but then found itself under the rule of Saba’. Only in about 400 BCE were the Minaeans able to ally themselves to Ḥaḑramawt and free themselves from direct Saba’ rule. In the 4th century both Ma’īn and Ḥaḑramawt were ruled by the same family, a close relationship that broke up again probably in the second half of the same century (approx 350-300 BCE). The next capital of the kingdom was Yathill (modern Baraqish) and later Qarnāwu (near modern Ma’īn). The kingdom enjoyed its golden age in the 3rd century BCE when it was able to extend its influence all along the incense trail due to the conquest of Najrān, ‘Asīr and Ḥijāz. From the time of Waqah'il Sadiq I. (sources differ on when this golden age was, by as much as 2 centuries; Hermann von Wissmann has it a during 360 BCE, while Kenneth A. Kitchen dates it to approximately 190–175 BCE) Minaean rule reached as far as Dedan. The extent of their long-distance trade is also shown by the presence of Minaean merchants in the Aegean. With the expansion of Ma’īn as far as the Red Sea they were also able to carry out sea trade. At the end of the 2nd century BCE Ma’īn found itself under the rule of Qatabān, but after the collapse of the Qatabānian Empire a few centuries later, the Minaean Kingdom fell too. The area was under Sabaean rule at the latest by the time the Roman general Aelius Gallus waged a military campaign in the area in 25/24 BCE.

Trade
The Minaeans, like some other Arabian and Yemenite kingdoms of the same period, were involved in the extremely lucrative spice trade, especially frankincense and myrrh. Inscriptions found in Qanāwu mention a number of major caravan stations along the trading route, including Yathrib (Medina) and Gaza; there is also a brief account of how war between the Egyptians and Syrians interrupted the trade for a while.

The Minaeans had a different social structure to the rest of the Old South Arabians. Their king was the only one involved in lawmaking, along with a council of elders, who in Ma'īn represented the priesthood as well as families of high social class. The Minaeans were divided into groups of various sizes, led by a very high official called the kabīr, appointed once every two years, who was in charge of one or sometimes all of the trading posts. The reason for this difference in social structure is unknown.

Kings
The order of succession and the dates of individual Minaean kings is extremely uncertain; the following table presents the reconstruction of Kenneth A. Kitchen. It should however be pointed out that the reconstruction of Hermann von Wissmann deviates from this considerably, and is just as probable.

See also
Ancient history of Yemen
Ancient South Arabian art
Yemen
Sabaean Kingdom
Qataban
Minaean language

Notes

References

Bibliography
Alessandro de Maigret. Arabia Felix, translated Rebecca Thompson. London: Stacey International, 2002. 
Andrey Korotayev. Ancient Yemen. Oxford: Oxford University Press, 1995. .
Andrey Korotayev. Pre-Islamic Yemen. Wiesbaden: Harrassowitz Verlag, 1996. .
Mounir Arbach: Le madhabien: lexique, onomastique et grammaire d'une langue de l'Arabie méridionale préislamique. Vol. 4: Réexamen de la chronologie des rois de Ma'in d'après les nouvelles donnéées. Aix-en-Provence, 1993
Kenneth A. Kitchen: The World of Ancient Arabia Series. Documentation for Ancient Arabia. Part I. Chronological Framework & Historical Sources. Liverpool, 1994
Jacqueline Pirenne: Paléographie des Inscriptions sud-arabes, Vol. I. (Verhandelingen van de Koninklijke Vlaamse Academie voor Wetenschappen, Letteren en Schone Kunsten van België. Klasse der Letteren. Verhandeling Nr. 26) Brussels, 1956
Hermann von Wissmann: Die Geschichte des Sabäerreiches und der Feldzug des Aelius Gallus, in:  Hildegard Temporini: Aufstieg und Niedergang der Römischen Welt. II. Principat. Ninth Volume, First Half Volume, De Gruyter, Berlin, New York 1976 , pp. 308–544

External links
Info Please
Britannica Online

Tribes of Arabia
Ancient history of Yemen
Former kingdoms